Dry Fork is a stream in Jefferson, St. Francois and Ste. Genevieve counties in the U.S. state of Missouri. It is a tributary of Plattin Creek.

The stream flows to the northeast into Ste. Genevieve County just north of the Goose Creek Lake community. The stream flows north through the west portion of Ste. Genevieve County and enters Jefferson County.

Dry Fork was named for the fact it often runs dry.

See also
List of rivers of Missouri

References

Rivers of Jefferson County, Missouri
Rivers of St. Francois County, Missouri
Rivers of Ste. Genevieve County, Missouri
Rivers of Missouri